Miwako (written: 美和子, 三和子 or 実和子) is a feminine Japanese given name. Notable people with the name include:

, Japanese actress
, Japanese model, actress and television personality
, Japanese swimmer
, Japanese synchronized swimmer
, Japanese singer
, Japanese actress
, Japanese fencer
, Japanese long-distance runner

Japanese feminine given names